KSK may refer to:

 Kagyu Shenpen Kunchab, a Tibetan Buddhist temple in Santa Fe, New Mexico
 Kala Shah Kaku, a town in Sheikhupura, Punjab, Pakistan
 , a sports club from Izmir, Turkey
 Kechara Soup Kitchen, an NGO in Malaysia
 Key Signing Key, in the Domain Name System Security Extensions (DNSSEC)
 Khao Sam Kaeo, a center of metal production and transshipment on the Kra Isthmus (modern Thailand) in the mid-to-late 1st millennium BCE 
 Kill Switch...Klick, an American industrial rock band
 Kissing Suzy Kolber, a former American sports blog
 , a subcategory of Sparkasse (Germany)
 , part of Germany's Special Forces
 KSK (grain terminal), a container terminal of the Port of Novorossiysk on the Russian Black Sea coast
 K. S. Krishnan, Indian scientist